Antone is both a surname and a masculine given name. Notable people with the name include:

Surname:
Annie Antone (born 1955), American basket weaver
Bruce Antone (born 1960), American politician
Clifford Antone (1949–2006), American blues musician
Steve Antone (1921–2014), American politician

Given name:
Antone "Tony" Costa (1944-1974), American serial killer
Antone Davis (born 1967), American football player
Antone Smith (born 1985), American football player
Antone Williamson (born 1973), American baseball player

See also

Antona (name)
Antono (name)
Antone, Oregon, former community in Wheeler County, Oregon, United States
Antonee
Antonen

Masculine given names